St. Dominic's Convent English Medium School is a private Catholic secondary school, located in Palakkad, Kerala, India. The school was established in 1995 by the Dominican Sisters. The school campus is located in Sreekrishnapuram, a village situated between the major towns Cherpulassery and Mannarkkad. The school is affiliated to CBSE.

History
The school was  started in 1995 as a convent and then later on turned out to be an educational institution. The school was initially situated in the Sreekrishnapuram neighbourhood with a limited number of pupils and staff. Then, with the help of the school management and parents the school was shifted to the current place.

See also

 Education in India
 List of schools in Kerala

References

External links

Dominican schools in India
Catholic secondary schools in India
Christian schools in Kerala
High schools and secondary schools in Kerala
Schools in Palakkad district
Educational institutions established in 1995
1995 establishments in Kerala